Her Penalty is a 1921 British silent drama film directed by Einar Bruun and starring Stewart Rome, Pauline Peters and Clive Brook.

Cast 
 Stewart Rome as James Fenwick 
 Pauline Peters as Vera Trenchard 
 Clive Brook as Robert Trenchard 
 Philip Hewland as Arthur Winterby

References

Bibliography
 Low, Rachael. History of the British Film, 1918-1929. George Allen & Unwin, 1971.

External links

1921 films
1921 drama films
British silent feature films
British drama films
Films directed by Einar Bruun
1920s English-language films
1920s British films
Silent drama films